Group H of the 2014 FIFA World Cup consisted of Belgium, Algeria, Russia and South Korea. Play began on 17 June and ended on 26 June 2014. The top two teams, Belgium and Algeria, advanced to the round of 16.

Teams

Notes

Standings

Belgium advanced to play the United States (the runners-up of Group G) in the round of 16.
Algeria advanced to play Germany (the winners of Group G) in the round of 16.

Matches

Belgium vs Algeria
The two teams had met in two previous matches, both friendlies, most recently in 2003, won 3–1 by Belgium.

Algeria took a one-goal lead in the first half after Sofiane Feghouli converted a penalty kick, awarded for a foul on him by Jan Vertonghen. Belgium came back with two goals in the second half, both scored by substitutes.
The equaliser was scored by Marouane Fellaini, heading in a cross from the left by Kevin De Bruyne, followed by the game winner scored by Dries Mertens from a pass by Eden Hazard.

Feghouli's goal snapped Algeria's 506-minute World Cup scoreless streak stretching back to 1986, second place at the time to the record of 517 minutes between 1930 and 1990 held by Bolivia.

Russia vs South Korea
The two teams had met in one previous match, in a friendly in 2013.

After a goalless first half, the two teams traded goals by substitutes in the second half as the match finished 1–1. First, Han Kook-young passed to Lee Keun-ho, and his long range shot was spilled by Russian goalkeeper Igor Akinfeev into the net.
Russia equalised after Alan Dzagoev's shot was parried by South Korean goalkeeper Jung Sung-ryong, the clearance hit Andrey Yeshchenko, and Aleksandr Kerzhakov scored from close range.

Belgium vs Russia
The two teams had met in eight previous matches (including matches involving the Soviet Union), including four in the FIFA World Cup (1970, group stage: Belgium 1–4 Soviet Union; 1982, second group stage: Belgium 0–1 Soviet Union; 1986, round of 16: Belgium 4–3 (aet) Soviet Union; 2002, group stage: Belgium 3–2 Russia).

Aleksandr Kokorin had Russia's best chance in the first half, heading wide from six yards. Late in the second half, Belgian substitute Kevin Mirallas hit the post with his free kick, but Belgium did find the game-winner through another substitute, Divock Origi scoring from 8 yards out after Eden Hazard's cut-back from the left. This victory sent Belgium into the knockout stage.

South Korea vs Algeria
The two teams had met in two previous matches, both in friendlies both in 1985.

Algeria, who needed at least a point to stay alive in the competition, scored three goals in the first half to take a comfortable lead. First, Islam Slimani sped past two South Korean defenders to receive Carl Medjani's long pass and slot home with his left foot past the advancing goalkeeper. Two minutes later, Rafik Halliche headed in Abdelmoumene Djabou's corner from the left. Djabou scored himself later after he received a pass from Slimani, shooting low with his left foot from twelve yards out. Early in the second half, Son Heung-min controlled a long pass from Ki Sung-yueng to shoot with his left foot between the goalkeeper's legs and reduce the deficit, but Yacine Brahimi restored Algeria's three-goal lead after a one-two with Sofiane Feghouli to side foot home from inside the penalty area with his right foot. Koo Ja-cheol scored South Korea's second goal after a pass from Lee Keun-ho from the left, but Algeria held on for its third ever World Cup victory, but its first since 24 June 1982.

Algeria became the first African team to score four goals in a World Cup match.

South Korea vs Belgium
The two teams had met in three previous matches, including twice in the FIFA World Cup group stage (1990: South Korea 0–2 Belgium; 1998: South Korea 1–1 Belgium).

Belgium, who had already qualified for the knockout stage and would win the group if either South Korea did not win this match, or Algeria didn't beat Russia in the other simultaneous match, had Steven Defour sent off for a reckless tackle on Kim Shin-wook at the end of the first half. Belgium scored the only goal of the match in the second half, when substitute Divock Origi's shot was parried by South Korea goalkeeper Kim Seung-gyu and Jan Vertonghen converted the rebound with his left foot.

Belgium's win ensured that they topped their group, while South Korea, who had to win by two goals to have any chance for qualification to the knockout stage, were eliminated.

South Korea's elimination meant that all four Asian representatives finished bottom of their group with a combined record of zero wins, three draws and nine defeats, the worst showing by the Asian Football Confederation since the 1990 World Cup.

Algeria vs Russia

The two teams had met in three previous matches (only involving matches during the time period of the Soviet Union).

Aleksandr Kokorin opened the scoring for Russia, who had to win to have chance of qualifying for the knockout stage, in the 6th minute when he scored with a header after a cross from Dmitri Kombarov from the left. Algeria equalised in the 60th minute when Islam Slimani scored with a header at the back post after a free kick from the left by Yacine Brahimi was missed by Russian goalkeeper Igor Akinfeev. Algeria held on for the draw, and as South Korea lost to Belgium in the other match played at the same time, Algeria finished as group runners-up and reached the second round for the first time in their history (after unsuccessful campaigns in 1982, 1986, and 2010), while Russia failed to advance out of the group stage in all three tournaments since the break-up of the Soviet Union.

For Algeria's goal, television replays showed that Akinfeev had a green laser light shining in his face during the play.
After the match the Algerian Football Federation was fined 50,000 CHF by FIFA for the use of laser pointers, a prohibited item in the stadium according to FIFA Stadium Safety and Security Regulations, and other violations of the rules by Algerian fans.

With fellow African representative Nigeria also reaching the knockout stage earlier, this was the first time that there were two teams from the Confederation of African Football in the knockout stage of a World Cup.

Notes

References

External links
2014 FIFA World Cup Group H, FIFA.com

2014 FIFA World Cup
Algeria at the 2014 FIFA World Cup
Belgium at the 2014 FIFA World Cup
Russia at the 2014 FIFA World Cup
South Korea at the 2014 FIFA World Cup